Özge is a common female Turkish given name. In Turkish, "Özge" means "Different", "Distinct", "Unique", "Ablude", and/or "Daredevil".

People
 Çağıl Özge Özkul (born 1988), Turkish beauty pageant titleholder
 Özge Akın (born 1985), Turkish sprinter
 Ozge Yagiz (born 1997), Turkish actress
 Özge Bayrak (born 1992), Turkish badminton player
 Özge Borak (born 1982), Turkish actress
 Özge Kanbay (1996–2019), Turkish women's footballer and referee
 Özge Kavurmacıoğlu (born 1993), Turkish female basketball player
 Özge Kırdar (born 1985), Turkish female volleyball player
 Özge Özberk (born 1976), Turkish actress
 Özge Özel (born 1991), Turkish women's footballer
 Özge Özpirinçci (born 1986), Turkish actress
 Özge Samancı (born 1975), Turkish American artist
 Özge Ulusoy (born 1982), Turkish top model, professional ballerina and occasional film actress
 Özgenur Yurtdagülen (born 1993), Turkish volleyball player
 Özge Gürel (born 1987), Turkish television and film actress

Turkish unisex given names